Grayson Highlands State Park is a state park located in Grayson County, Virginia, United States. It is adjacent to the Mount Rogers National Recreation Area and lies within the Jefferson National Forest. The park hosts a number of outdoor activities including hiking, camping, mountainbiking, horseback riding, and backpacking. A 2.8 mile (4.5 km) portion of the Appalachian Trail runs through the park in addition to a number of other hiking and horseback riding trails. The state park is musically notable as the home for the Grayson Highlands Fall Festival as well as weekly jam sessions by local folk musicians, who draw upon the traditional styles of the Blue Ridge area. The park is also home to the Wayne C. Henderson Festival and Guitar Competition, a regionally important festival and guitarist contest named for local notable guitar-maker Wayne Henderson.
 The park also has a campground cabin store with candies and ice cream inside.
The park hosts forests like those on nearby Mount Rogers, as well as a number of mountain meadows or balds.  These meadows provide excellent views of the surrounding area and present a striking change in scenery from the surrounding forests.  The balds are dominated by large rocky outcroppings clear of vegetation excepting the occasional windswept tree and low grasses.

Ponies 

The balds are inhabited by a herd of introduced ponies allowed to run wild within the confines of the park.  The ponies are very accustomed to humans and rarely halt their grazing as hikers pass close by.  Many locals touch and feed the ponies, though this practice is frowned upon and against park policy.  Each year, park officials round up the herd and check for health problems in addition to reducing the herd size if necessary; the excess colts are sold at auction.

Festivals 
The Wayne C. Henderson Music Festival and Guitar Competition is held at the park every June. The festival, named for local musician and luthier Wayne C. Henderson, features old time music and bluegrass music.

The Grayson Highlands Fall Festival is an annual event held at the park during the fall.  The festival hosts a variety of entertainment including live bluegrass and traditional music, molasses making, and demonstrations focusing on pioneer-living.  The festival is also home to a local crafts fair and auctions for the selling of excess colts from the "wild" pony herd managed by the Wilburn Ridge Pony Association.

Trails

Hiking trails

 Rhododendron Trail: 1.0 mile (1.6 km)
 Cabin Creek Trail: 1.9 miles (3.1 km) loop
 Big Pinnacle Trail: 0.4 mile (0.6 km)
 Twin Pinnacles Trail: 1.6 miles (2.6 km)
 Listening Rock Trail: 2.0 mile (3.2 km) loop
 Wilson Creek Trail: 1.8 miles (2.9 km)
 Stampers Branch Trail: 2.0 miles (3.2 km)
 Rock House Ridge Trail: 1.2 miles (1.9 km) loop
 Appalachian Trail: 2.8 miles (4.5 km)
 Horse Trail (east): 1.7 miles (2.7 km)
 Horse Trail (north): 1.0 mile (1.6 km)
 Seed Orchard Road: 1.3 miles (2.1 km)
 Old Upchurch Road: 3.7 (6.0 km)
 Service Road: 0.5 mile (0.8 km)
 Appalachian Spur Trail: 0.75 mile (1.2 km)
 Wilburn Branch Trail: 0.8 mile (1.3 km)

Horseback riding trails
Horse Trail (east): 1.7 miles (2.7 km)
Horse Trail (north): 1.0 mile (1.6 km)
Seed Orchard Road: 1.3 miles (2.1 km)
Old Upchurch Road: 3.7 miles (6.0 km)

Nearby state parks
The following state parks are within  of Grayson Highlands State Park:
Elk Knob State Park, North Carolina
Hungry Mother State Park
New River State Park, North Carolina
New River Trail State Park
Mount Jefferson State Natural Area, North Carolina
Rendezvous Mountain State Park, North Carolina
Stone Mountain State Park, North Carolina

References

See also 
 List of Virginia State Parks

External links 
http://www.dcr.virginia.gov/state-parks/grayson-highlands.shtml
http://sherpaguides.com/virginia/mountains/blue_ridge/grayson_highlands.html
http://hikingthecarolinas.com/Mt%20Rogers1.php
http://www.ghfallfestival.50megs.com/

State parks of Virginia
State parks of the Appalachians
Parks in Grayson County, Virginia
Protected areas established in 1965
1965 establishments in Virginia
Southwest Virginia
Western Virginia